Kantili is a mountain range in the northwestern part of the island of Euboea in Greece. Its maximum elevation is 1,246 m. It stretches along the west coast of the island, above the shore of the North Euboean Gulf, between Limni and Politika. Its length is about 25 km from southeast to northwest. The slope towards the sea is very steep, and there is no road along the coast. The Greek National Road 77 (Chalcis - Istiaia) passes east of the mountains.

See also

 List of mountains in Greece

References

Euboea
Mountain ranges of Greece
Landforms of Central Greece
Landforms of Euboea (regional unit)